Céline Allewaert is a Belgian spongiologist who works at Ghent University.

Publications 
Invertebrate Systematics, 26(3): 230-248. Abstract:

References 

Spongiologists
Belgian zoologists
Living people
Women zoologists
Year of birth missing (living people)